"I'm Real" is a hip hop-R&B song recorded by James Brown. It was co-written and produced by Full Force and appeared on Brown's 1988 album of the same name. The song's horn section is reminiscent of both Soul Power and Think(About It)  Released as a single the same year, it charted #2 R&B. Described in Rolling Stone as "[Brown's] I'm-the-original rapper song", its lyrics assert his primacy and relevance as a performer over and against the many musicians who sample his work.

References

James Brown songs
Songs written by James Brown
1988 singles
1988 songs
Scotti Brothers Records singles